The Salon d'Hercule (also known as the Hercules Salon or the Hercules Drawing Room) is on the first floor of the Château de Versailles and connects the Royal Chapel in the North Wing of the château with the grand appartement du roi.

Description
Originally, the fourth and penultimate chapel, the salon d’Hercule occupies the tribune level of this chapel.  Initially called the nouveau salon près de la chapelle  (new salon near the chapel) when the room was started in 1710 by Robert de Cotte for Louis XIV.  However, with the death of Louis XIV in 1715 the project was postponed (Verlet, 321).

Beginning in 1724, work on the salon d’Hercule recommenced. Louis XV commissioned architect Jacques Gabriel, marbrier Claude-Félix Tarlé, and sculptors Jacques Verberckt and François-Antoine Vassé to complete the room (Verlet, 321).

The room was completed in 1736 with the ceiling painting Apothéose d’Hercule (Apotheosis of Hercules) by François Lemoyne, which gave the room its present name (Verlet, 322).

There are only two other paintings decorating this room, both of which are by Veronese.  Above the fireplace is the artist’s Rebecca at the Well; on the opposite wall forming a pendant is the famed Feast in the House of Simon (Verlet, 322). Louis XIV received the latter painting as a diplomatic gift from the Republic of Venice in 1664.  Owing to the size of the work – 4.5 meters high by 9.7 meters long – the painting was displayed in the galerie d’Apollon of the Louvre.  It was installed in salon d’Hercule in 1730 where it remained until 1832 at which time it was transferred to the Louvre. In 1961 the Feast in the House of Simon was returned to the salon d’Hercule.  In 1994, under the aegis of the Société des amis de Versailles and BNP the painting was restored.

During the reign of Louis XV the room served as a ball room as the king felt the salon de Mars was too small and the galerie des glaces was too large.  The inaugural ball held in the salon d’Hercule was on 26 January 1739 to celebrate the marriage of Louis XV’s eldest daughter Marie Louise-Élisabeth with Infante Filipe of Spain (Luynes, 335-345); and the wedding dinner au grand courvert of the duc de Chartres on 5 January 1769 (Verlet, 323).  After the destruction of the escalier des ambassadeurs in 1752, Louis XV planned for the salon d’Hercule to be the landing for a new staircase for the château (Verlet, 323).

During the reign of Louis XVI the salon d’Hercule served for diplomatic functions such as the embassy sent by the bey of Tunis (January 1777); the receptions of the representatives of the Three Estates of the Estates-General (May 1789); and, the reception of the embassy of the sultan Mysore (September 1778) (Verlet, 555).

Gallery of images

Notes

Sources

External links

Palace of Versailles
World Heritage Sites in France
Art museums and galleries in France
Baroque architecture at Versailles